The Kellerwald-Edersee National Park, CDDA-No. 318077) in the North Hessian county of Waldeck-Frankenberg is a national park, 57.38 km² in area, that lies south of the Edersee lake in the northern part of the low mountain range of the Kellerwald in the German state of Hesse. Since 25 June 2011 the beech forested area of the national park has been part of the UNESCO World Heritage Site known as Ancient and Primeval Beech Forests of the Carpathians and Other Regions of Europe, because of its testimony to the ecological history of the beech family and the forest dynamics of Europe since the Last Glacial Period. 

The national park administration is located in the east of the park at Bad Wildungen.

Literature 
 
 
 
  
Edersee Game Park
The Edersee game park is home to wildlife species from the local forests as well as species that used to inhabit our landscape, but no longer do so. Amidst the WildtierPark game park is the bird of prey station. There you can experience eagle owls, hawks, red kites, stone and imperial eagles close-up.

Film 
 Im Nationalpark Kellerwald-Edersee, documentary, 45 minutes, Germany, 2005, Buch und Regie: Ina Knobloch, Manfred Praxl und Hiltrud Jäschke, Produktion: MDR

Footnotes and references

External links 

 Official website of the National Park
 Official website of the Kellerwald National Park Centre
 Official website of Edersee Touristic
 Foundation for the Nationalpark Kellerwald-Edersee e.V.
 Sheep project by the National Park Sheepery
 Schaurig ist das falsche Wort, Frankfurter Allgemeine Zeitung, 31 August 2008
 Nationalpark Kellerwald-Edersee radio broadcast hr4, 10 July 2013

KellerwaldEdersee
KellerwaldEdersee
Waldeck-Frankenberg
IUCN Category II
Protected areas established in 2004
2004 establishments in Germany